Sweat is the third studio album by American rapper Nelly. It was intended to be released on August 17, 2004, before being delayed and released on September 13, 2004, by Universal Records. Production was handled by several producers, including Jason "Jay E" Epperson, Midi Mafia, The Neptunes, Trife, Jazze Pha, Doe and the Alchemist. Released in conjunction with Suit, Nelly intended to release a single album before conceptualizing and releasing two albums simultaneously, both which would contrast each other's themes. Nelly characterized Sweat as "more up-tempo" and "energetic" while describing Suit as more of "a grown-up and sexy vibe [...] it's more melodic".

Background
While recording material for his third studio album, Nelly had his intention of producing one album. Songs were being recorded at a steady pace, with Nelly composing more ideas, to which he established the idea of two albums released simultaneously to house all the tracks. On April 27, 2004, Nelly's representative initially described the upcoming albums as thematically dissimilar, "one is more melodic and party-oriented in the vein of records like "E.I." and "Tip Drill", while the other was described as having a "harder edge". Nelly released singles accompanied by music videos from both albums. Talking to MTV News, Nelly described the differences between both albums; their titles of Sweat and Suit were announced on May 27, 2004. He noted Sweat as "more up-tempo" and "energetic", while characterizing Suit as more of "a grown-up and sexy vibe [...] it's more melodic".

Release
Sweat and Suit were intended to be released on August 17, 2004, but were pushed back and released on September 14 in the United States, Canada and Japan. Sweat was released on September 13, 2004, in the United Kingdom and Germany.

Commercial performance

In its opening week, Sweat debuted at number 2 on the US Billboard 200 chart, selling 342,000  copies. On the same day of Sweat release, Nelly's Suit, released in conjunction with the former album, debuted at number one on the Billboard 200, selling 396,000 copies, becoming his third consecutive US number-one album following Country Grammar (2000) and Nellyville (2002). The combination of both album's opening figures of 737,000 surpasses that of Nellyville, which debuted with 714,000 copies sold. With the debuts, Nelly became the first act to achieve the feat of obtaining album's number one and number 2 on the US Top R&B/Hip Hop Albums chart simultaneously. He is the second artist, following American hard rock band Guns N' Roses, to achieve the same feat, but on the Billboard 200 chart. Guns N' Roses attained the accomplishment in 1991 with Use Your Illusion II and Use Your Illusion I, with the former debuting at number one and the latter at number 2, selling 770,000 and 685,000 copies, respectively.

The following week of Sweat release, it fell to number 4 on the Billboard 200 chart, selling 127,500 copies. In its third week, Sweat sold 80,000 copies, dropping to number 8. In the album's fourth week of release, its sales further decreased to 64,000 copies, falling to number 12. In its fifth week, Sweat again decreased, to 62,000 units, sustaining its position at number 12. The album's sales continued to decrease in its sixth week of release, selling 50,000 copies, moving to number 16 on the chart. On November 1, 2004, Sweat went on to be certified platinum by the Recording Industry Association of America (RIAA), denoting shipments of 1,000,000 copies.

Track listing

Sample credits
"Heart of a Champion" – Contains a sample of "Roundball Rock" performed by John Tesh
"Na Nana Na" – Contains a sample of "2 of Amerikaz Most Wanted" performed by 2Pac
"American Dream" – Contains a sample of "Tired of Ballin'" performed by Tela
"Tilt Ya Head Back" – Contains a sample of "Superfly" performed by Curtis Mayfield
"Playa" – Contains a sample of "Magnetic Dance 2" performed by Lee Ryda

Personnel 
Credits adapted from Allmusic.

Nelly – executive producer
Jayson "Koko" Bridges – producer
Andrew Coleman – engineer
The Alchemist – producer
Sandy Brummels – art direction
Al Byno – engineer
Jasper Cameron – producer
Dirty Swift – producer
Doe – producer
Phillip Duckett – producer
Michael Eleopoulos – assistant
Jason "Jay E" Epperson – producer
Loretta J. Galbreath – direction
Chris Gehringer – mastering
Harold Guy – assistant
Jennifer Havey – A&R
Tal Herzberg – engineer

Jazze Pha – producer
Jun Ishizeki – engineer
Chip Karpells – assistant
Kevin Law – A&R
Marc Stephen Lee – engineer
Jonathan Mannion – photography
NDoffene MBodji – assistant
Carl Nappa – engineer
The Neptunes – producer
Jared Nugent – assistant
Dave Pensado – mixing
Joe Spix – art direction, design
T-Mix – producer
Richard Travali – mixing
Trife – keyboards, producer
Bruce Waynne – producer
James White – photography

Chart positions

Weekly charts

Year-end charts

Certifications

References

External links 
 Sweat at Discogs (list of releases)

2004 albums
Albums produced by the Alchemist (musician)
Albums produced by Jazze Pha
Nelly albums
Universal Records albums